The 1952 Railway Cup Hurling Championship was the 26th series of the inter-provincial hurling Railway Cup. Three matches were played between 17 February 1952 and 17 March 1952 to decide the title. It was contested by Connacht, Leinster, Munster and Ulster.

Munster entered the championship as the defending champions.

On 17 March 1952, Munster won the Railway Cup after a 5–11 to 4–02 defeat of Connacht in the final at Croke Park, Dublin. It was their 20th Railway Cup title overall and their fifth title in succession.

Munster's Christy Ring was the Railway Cup top scorer with 4-05.

Results

Semi-finals

Final

Sources

 Donegan, Des, The Complete Handbook of Gaelic Games (DBA Publications Limited, 2005).

References

Railway Cup Hurling Championship
Railway Cup Hurling Championship